Captain General Royal Marines is the ceremonial head of the Royal Marines. The current Captain General is King Charles III. This position is distinct from that of the Commandant General Royal Marines, the professional head of the corps, who is currently ranked as a General.

History
Appointed by the monarch of the United Kingdom, the ceremonial head of the Royal Marines was the Colonel in Chief until the title changed to Captain General in 1948. The uniform and insignia worn by the Captain General are those of a Royal Marines Colonel or higher depending on the appointee's current or previously held rank. As Captain General Royal Marines, Prince Harry was entitled to wear the rank insignia of a Field Marshal or Major General. Despite this, Prince Harry, at least on some occasions, wore the rank insignia of a Colonel, which is traditionally worn by some Colonels-in-chief in the British Army.

King Charles III was announced as Captain General on 28 October 2022, on the 358th anniversary of the corps' founding by King Charles II in 1664.

Post holders
The post has been held by the following:

See also

 British and U.S. military ranks compared
 British Army Other Ranks rank insignia
 British Army officer rank insignia
 Captain General
 Lord High Admiral

Notes

References

 
Military appointments of the Royal Marines